Wyoming Public Schools is a school district located in Wyoming, Michigan. The district serves 4,500 students 

It contains one high school, two middle schools, four elementary schools, one preschool, and one alternative program.

On March 12, 2012, the Wyoming Public Schools Board of Education voted in favor of 4–3 to restructure the district, effective with the 2012–13 school year. This combined both high schools into a single high school held on the campus of Rogers High School, which served students in grades 10 to 12. Wyoming Park High School became Wyoming Junior High, serving students in grades 7 to 9.

Intermediate School
Intermediate School serves 491 students in grades 5–6.

Wyoming Junior High
Wyoming Junior High serves 628 students in grades 7–8.

Elementary schools
The district has seven elementary schools which serve the city of Wyoming, MI.

Gladiola Elementary School serves 357 students in grades K-4.
Huntington Woods Early Childhood Center serves 341 students in grades Pre-K.
Oriole Park Elementary School serves 337 students in grades K-4.
Parkview Elementary School serves 372 students in grades K-4.
West Elementary School serves 328 students in grades K-4.

References

External links
 

School districts in Michigan
Education in Kent County, Michigan